The Loreto is a meteorite that was found in Baja California Sur, Mexico.

It was donated, by Stuart H. Perry, to the United States National Museum. Today, it resides in the collection of the National Museum of Natural History.

References

See also
 Glossary of meteoritics
 

Artifacts in the collection of the Smithsonian Institution
Meteorites found in Mexico
Iron meteorites